Knutsen is a Norwegian surname. Its origin was as a patronymic name (-sen/-søn/-son/-zen) derived from the first name Knut. Notable people with the surname include:

Arvid Knutsen (1944–2009), Norwegian footballer and later coach
Espen Knutsen (born 1972), Norwegian ice hockey player
Finn Knutsen (born 1932), Norwegian politician
Geir Knutsen (born 1959), Norwegian politician for the Labour Party
Guro Knutsen (born 1985), Norwegian football player
Konrad B. Knutsen (born 1925), Norwegian civil servant
Lars Knutsen (1884–1963), Norwegian shipowner, founder of Lars Knutsen and Sons Ltd, a ship chandler business in Wales
Marie Knutsen (born 1982), Norwegian football midfielder
Morten Knutsen (born 1977), Norwegian football coach and former player
Nelly Bell Knutsen (1905–1991), Norwegian politician for the Christian Democratic Party
Olav Martinus Knutsen Steinnes (1886–1961), Norwegian Minister of Education and Church Affairs in 1928
Paul Knutsen Barstad Sandvik (1847–1936), Norwegian educator
Peter Tessem and Paul Knutsen, Norwegian explorers who went with Roald Amundsen on his 1918 Arctic expedition
Tormod Knutsen (1932–2021), Norwegian Nordic combined athlete
Tove Karoline Knutsen (born 1951), Norwegian politician for the Labour Party
Venke Knutson (born 1978), Norwegian pop artist

See also
Knutsen & Ludvigsen, Norwegian singing duo having written and performed various songs for children
Knutsen & Ludvigsens Beste, greatest hits album by Knutsen & Ludvigsen, covering 22 songs from 1970 to 1988
Knutsen & Ludvigsens Ver'ste', compilation album by Knutsen & Ludvigsen, covering 20 songs from 1970 to 1997
MT Sidsel Knutsen, Norwegian oil tanker built in 1993
Knudsen (disambiguation)
Knutsen Lake, a lake in Minnesota

Norwegian-language surnames